Pečky is a town in Kolín District in the Central Bohemian Region of the Czech Republic. It has about 4,800 inhabitants.

Administrative parts
The village of Velké Chvalovice is an administrative part of Pečky.

Geography
It lies in a flat agricultural landscape of the Central Elbe Table. It lies on the left bank of the Výrovka stream.

History
The first written mention of Pečky is in a donation deed of King Ottokar I from 1225. For centuries, it was a small agricultural community, often changing their owners and often divided between several estates.

After 1869, the railway was built and several larger companies were established, focused on the production of agricultural needs and processing of sugar beet. In 1879, Pečky became a market town, and in 1925, it became a town.

Demographics

Sights

The early Cubist building of the Evangelical Church of Master Jan Hus was completed in 1915 and is among the most important monuments in the town. The second important monument is the neo-Romanesque Catholic Church of Saint Wenceslaus, consecrated in 1913. It has unique Art Nouveau decoration.

The town hall was built in the Art Nouveau style in 1901.

Notable people
Josef Křovák (1884–1951), geodesist, author of Křovák's projection
Alois Vocásek (1896–2003), soldier, World War I veteran
Vladimír Renčín (1941–2017), illustrator and cartoonist
Tomáš Kuchař (born 1976), footballer

References

External links

Cities and towns in the Czech Republic
Populated places in Kolín District